Rumiana Hristova Bojadjieva-Gocheva (born July 21, 1957) is a Bulgarian chess Woman International Master from 1981.

Rumiana Gocheva was 6 times Bulgarian Women's Champion - 1980, 1982, 1984, 1987, 1989, 1991.

She has played for Bulgaria in 5 Chess Olympiads, La Valletta 1980 (Malta), Lucerne 1982 (Switzerland), Thessaloniki 1984 (Greece), Dubai 1986 (United Arab Emirates) and Novi Sad 1990 (Yugoslavia, today's Serbia).

External links
 
Rumiana Gocheva player profile and chess games at chess-db.com
 

1957 births
Bulgarian female chess players
Chess Woman International Masters
People from Asenovgrad
Living people